Gabl is a Germanic surname. Notable people with the surname include:

Franz Gabl (1921–2014), Austrian alpine skier 
Gertrude Gabl (1948–1976), Austrian alpine skier, niece of Franz

See also
Gable (surname)

Germanic-language surnames